The Chrysler Voyager (and the long-wheelbase Chrysler Grand Voyager) is a minivan produced by the Chrysler division of Stellantis. In the current lineup, it is positioned as the lower-end Chrysler minivan, having replaced the Dodge Grand Caravan in 2020, below the Chrysler Pacifica.

The Chrysler Voyager was introduced in Europe in 1988, and was a rebadged version of the Dodge Caravan in the United States. It originally evolved with the Caravan, the Plymouth Voyager, and the Chrysler Town & Country. In the United States, the Chrysler Voyager nameplate replaced the short-wheelbase (SWB) version of the Plymouth Voyager following the folding of the Plymouth division by DaimlerChrysler AG in 2001, and was discontinued in 2003. The nameplate was revived for the 2021 model year following the discontinuation of the Dodge Grand Caravan after the 2020 model year, and is rebadged as the Chrysler Grand Caravan in Canada.

In Europe, the Chrysler Voyager was rebadged as the Lancia Voyager from the 2011 until 2016 model years. The Voyager was sold with different engines, including diesel engines, and was also available with manual transmission and a foot-operated emergency brake. Although now produced solely in Ontario, Canada, the Grand Voyagers were still available with diesel engines as standard. These diesel engines are based on a modern double overhead cam common rail design from VM Motori of Italy. The last European Chrysler Grand Voyagers are very similar to the 2008 and later Chrysler Town & Country cars, and were sold only in the long-wheelbase version (as in North America). Following the fifth generation, the Grand Voyager nameplate was discontinued in all markets.

Together with its nameplate variants, the Chrysler minivans have ranked as the 13th bestselling automotive nameplate worldwide, with over 12 million sold.

First generation (1988–1990)

The Caravan was first introduced as a North American minivan for the United States and Canadian markets, sold along with the identical Plymouth Voyager, in November 1983, for the 1984 model year. Interior trim, controls, and instrumentation were borrowed from the Chrysler K platform, and coupled with the lower floor enabled by the front-wheel-drive, the Caravan featured car-like ease of entry. 
The line was first introduced into the European market in 1988 as Dodge Caravans rebranded as Chryslers. Europe's Chrysler Voyager was nearly identical to the American Dodge Caravan except that the  turbocharged I4 engine and the 3.3 L Chrysler EGA V6 were not available.

Engines
2.2 L K I4
2.5 L K I4
3.0 L Mitsubishi 6G72 V6

Second generation (1991–1995)

Introduced for the 1991 model year, the Chrysler Voyager in Europe continued to be identical to the Dodge Caravan in the United States except that the 3.8 L V6 was not available for the Chrysler Voyager. This would be the final generation available with a manual transmission. A 2.5 L turbo-diesel four-cylinder engine produced by VM Motori was made available beginning in 1994.  There were also military modifications available for the Voyager in South Africa, which included large fuel tanks available in 240 and 360-liter capacities.

Engines
 2.5 L K I4
 2.5 L VM425 Turbo Diesel (1994–1995)
 3.0 L Mitsubishi 6G72 V6
 3.3 L EGA V6
 3.8L

Third generation (1996–2000)

The 1996–1999 models in Mexico are rebadged Dodge Caravans, although the Caravan was sold alongside the Voyager.  For 2000, the Chrysler Voyager was identical to the Plymouth Voyager except that the 3.8 L V6 was not available. Base models of the Voyager were offered in most states with either a 2.4 L four-cylinder or a 3.0 L Mitsubishi V6 engine, except in California and several northeastern states, where the Mitsubishi V6 didn't meet emissions standards. In those locales, the 3.3 L engine was offered instead.

For the European market, Voyagers continued to be rebadged Caravans. Unique to this market were 2.0 L Straight-4 SOHC and DOHC engines and 2.5 L turbo diesel produced by VM Motori. European market vans also came with manual transmissions and in a six-passenger model with six captains chairs, not available elsewhere.

Engines
 2.0 L A588 I4 SOHC
 2.0 L ECC I4 DOHC
 2.4 L EDZ I4
 2.5 L VM425 I4 Turbo Diesel
 3.3 L EGA V6
 3.8 L EGH V6 (AWD; not available in UK)
 3.0 L Mitsubishi 6G72 V6

Safety
According to Euro NCAP crash test results, the 1999 model Chrysler Voyager did so badly in the frontal impact that it earned no points, making it the worst of the group. The body structure became unstable and the steering column was driven back into the driver's chest and head'. The 2007 model Chrysler Voyager fared little better, achieving just 19% in the frontal impact test, with an overall score of 2 stars out of a possible 5. However, chest compression measurements on the test dummy 'indicated an unacceptably high risk of serious or fatal injury. As a result, the final star in the adult occupant rating is struck-through'.

Fourth generation (2001–2007)

From 2001 until 2003, the Voyager was offered in the SWB model only, replacing the SWB Plymouth Voyager. It resembled the Town and Country more than the previous generation, the only major cosmetic difference besides the trim (where the Town and Country's is fancier) was the placement of the Chrysler emblem on the grille. After the 2003 model year, the Voyager was discontinued (United States market) and replaced by the Chrysler Town and Country, SWB model. The SWB Town & Country continued under the Voyager name in the Mexican market.

Engines
 2001–2008 3.3 L EGA V6
 2001–2008 3.8 L EGH V6
 2001–2008 2.4 L EDZ I4
 2008–2011 (China) 3.0 L 6G72 V6

Year to year changes
2000: The Voyager is sold as a Plymouth and as a Chrysler, with the same options and features, however the Chrysler versions have sticker prices of about US$500 more.
2001: The Chrysler Voyager was completely redesigned for this year as were the other Chrysler minivans. It was now only sold under the Chrysler marque; no "Grand" LWB versions are sold. Some new features include side airbags and an optional navigation system.
2002: Either a VCR or a DVD-based rear-seat entertainment system was a new option available for dealer installation on all 2002 Voyagers. A high-value entry-level model, the eC was offered this year along with the base and LX models. All 2002 Voyagers now used a four-speed automatic transmission.
2003: Power-adjustable brake and accelerator pedals were available on 2003 Voyagers. Anti-lock brakes remained optional for the upscale LX, but were no longer available for base Voyagers. The Voyager was discontinued after this year and was replaced by the little-changed SWB Town and Country.

In Europe Chrysler began offering the Voyager with the first generation, followed by the second generation model in 2001, with a new engine range – including larger, more economical diesel engines (2.5 L and for 2005 – the 2.8 L 4 cylinder from VM Motori) and more fuel-efficient gasoline engines (I4 and V6).

The fourth generation Grand Voyager continued production for the Chinese market alongside the Dodge Grand Caravan until late 2010. Both models were built by Soueast in China, using a Town & Country production line relocated from Taiwan, and were powered by Mitsubishi 6G72 engines.

Fifth generation (2008–2016)

Chrysler introduced the new Grand Voyager for 2008 and successfully positioned it in the automotive market as a luxury MPV suited for large families. The Grand Voyager is visually identical to the Chrysler Town & Country which is sold in the North American and South American markets. In a similar fashion to the other large multi-purpose vehicles (MPVs) on the market, the Grand Voyager was sold with a standard diesel engine in Europe. This was also the first generation of the model that was not sold as the Chrysler Grand Caravan; markets in which it was previously sold under that nameplate received as either the Grand Voyager or Town & Country.

However, the seating is arranged in the 2–2–3 (front to rear) layout common in North America, rather than the 2–3–2 layout often seen in SUVs and MPVs in Europe. On right-hand drive (RHD) models the gear shift lever is placed on a floor-mounted console between the seats, in contrast to the instrument panel positioning found on LHD models.

Standard engine

(RA 428 DOHC)

Optional engine on top of the range Limited models:

 2008–2010: 3.8 L  EGH V6, 197 hp (147 kW) at 5200 rpm and 230 lb·ft (312 N·m) at 4000 rpm
 2010–2015: 3.6 L  Pentastar V6, 283 hp (211 kW) at 6600 rpm and 260 lb·ft (353 N·m) at 4800 rpm
All engines are paired with Chrysler's 62TE 6-speed automatic transmission with variable line pressure (VLP) technology (See Ultradrive).

Lancia Voyager

All Voyagers sold since October 2011 in continental Europe are sold under the Lancia brand.

The Chrysler-branded variant continues to be sold in the United Kingdom, Ireland, Russia, Australia, New Zealand, the Middle East, South Korea, Singapore, and China, as Lancia does not have sales operations in those markets. Voyager become the successor to previous unrelated series of minivans produced by Lancia, the last of which is the Phedra.

However, the parent company Fiat Chrysler Automobiles under the leadership of CEO Sergio Marchionne has decided to shut down both Chrysler and Lancia brands out of its European market (with the exception of keeping one model of Lancia available for sale in Italy). Due to this decision, the Lancia Voyager too is no longer being sold in Europe.

European engines
The Lancia version is offered with engines compliant with Euro V emission standards.

Safety

Sixth generation (2020–present)

For the 2020 model year, the Chrysler Pacifica's low-end L and LX models were separated from the Pacifica lineup and given the Voyager name. This marks the return of the Voyager nameplate to the Chrysler model lineup, in which it was last used in 2016, and the North American market, in which it was last used in 2003 and 2007 in the United States and Mexico, respectively. In addition to the L and LX trim levels, an LXi model will be available to fleet customers.

The 2020 Voyager went on sale in the U.S. in the fall of 2019 with base prices ranging from $26,985 for the entry L model to $32,995 for the fleet-only LXi model. Seven-passenger seating, a six-speaker sound system with Active Noise Cancellation, Apple CarPlay and Android Auto are standard on all models. Among the available options is the SafetyTec Group which includes rear park assist, blind-spot monitoring, and rear cross-path detection. The LX adds SiriusXM Satellite Radio and seventeen-inch aluminum-alloy wheels. The fleet-only LXi adds easy-clean leatherette-trimmed seating surfaces and dual heated front bucket seats. LX and LXi models offer a single-screen rear DVD entertainment system as on option. Unlike the Chrysler Pacifica, which is available with either front-wheel drive (FWD) or all-wheel drive (AWD), the Voyager is only offered with front-wheel drive.

Production of the Dodge Grand Caravan ended in 2020, thereby making Voyager the new entry minivan in FCA's U.S. lineup. In Canada, the Voyager nameplate was not in use for 2020 and all models still carried the Pacifica name. In the 2021 model year, FCA began selling Voyager as the Chrysler Grand Caravan in Canada. 

The 2022 Voyager is targeted exclusively for fleet buyers. Only offered in the LX model, the 2022 Voyager includes standard features that include heated front seats and steering wheel, second-row Stow 'n Go seats, clear air filtration system, Uconnect 5 system as well as power sliding doors and rear lift gate. There are just two option packages that provide more driver-assist and connectivity features.

The fleet-only 2022 Voyager model is predicted by Kelley Blue Book to have "attractive deals on the used market" as the rental companies begin selling them in a few years.

Seating features
The Chrysler Voyager has incorporated various seating systems for their minivans to enhance interior flexibility.

Integrated child safety seats
In 1992, Chrysler introduced a second-row bench seat integrating two child booster seats. These seats continued as an available option through fifth generation until they were discontinued in 2010.

Easy Out Roller Seats
In 1996, Chrysler introduced a system of seats to simplify installation, removal, and re-positioning— marketed as Easy-Out Roller Seats.  The system remained in use throughout the life of the Chrysler Voyager.

When installed, the seats are latched to floor-mounted strikers. When unlatched, eight rollers lift each seat, allowing it to be rolled fore and aft. Tracks have locator depressions for rollers, thus enabling simple installation. Ergonomic levers at the seatbacks release the floor latches single-handedly without tools and raise the seats onto the rollers in a single motion. Additionally, seatbacks were designed to fold forward.  Seat roller tracks are permanently attached to the floor and seat stanchions are aligned, facilitating the longitudinal rolling of the seats. Bench seat stanchions were moved inboard to reduce bending stress in the seat frames, allowing them to be lighter.

When configured as two- and three-person benches, the Easy Out Roller Seats could be unwieldy.  Beginning in 2001, second and third-row seats became available in a 'quad' configuration – bucket or captain chairs in the second row and a third-row three-person 50/50 split "bench" — with each section weighing under .

Stow'n Go seating
In 2005, Chrysler introduced a system of second and third-row seating that folded completely into under-floor compartments – marketed as Stow 'n Go seating and exclusively available on long-wheelbase models.

In a development program costing $400 million, engineers used an erector set to initially help visualize the complex interaction of the design and redesigned underfloor components to accommodate the system — including the spare tire well, fuel tank, exhaust system, parking brake cables, rear climate control lines, and the rear suspension. Even so, the new seating system precluded incorporation of an AWD system, effectively ending that option for the Chrysler minivans.

The Stow 'n Go system received Popular Science Magazine's "Best of What's New" for 2005 award.

The Stow 'n Go system is not offered on the Volkswagen Routan, a rebadged nameplate variant of the Chrysler minivans.

Swivel 'n Go seating
Chrysler introduced a seating system in 2008, marketed as Swivel'n Go.  In the seating system, two full-size second-row seats swivel to face the third row. A detachable table can be placed between the second and third-row seats.  The Swivel'n Go seating system includes the third-row seating from the Stow'n Go system.

The system is noted for its high strength. The entire load of the seat in the event of a crash is transferred through the swivel mechanism, which is almost twice as strong as the minimum government requirement.

The swivel mechanism includes bumpers that stabilize the seat while in the lock position. When rotated the seat comes off these bumpers to allow easy rotation.

The seat is not meant to be left in an unlocked position or swiveled with the occupant in it, although this will not damage the swivel mechanism.

Production worldwide

In the early years of its marketing (1988–1991), the Voyager was manufactured in North America and exported to Europe.
The Voyager began to be manufactured in Europe in 1991, at the Eurostar plant near Graz, Austria. Eurostar was a joint venture between Chrysler and the Austrian company Steyr-Daimler-Puch. It was later acquired by DaimlerChrysler and finally the plant was sold to Magna Steyr in 2002. The minivan production ended there at the end of 2007. Units produced in Austria were marketed in Europe, Asia, and Africa. They were built with gasoline and diesel engines, with manual transmission, in short-wheelbase (SWB) and long-wheelbase versions, and in right and left-hand drive versions (all sold as Chrysler Voyager).

From 2008 until 2010, the fourth generation Grand Voyager was produced in China by Soueast using a relocated Taiwanese Town & Country assembly line.

The fifth generation Voyagers (2008–2011) have been exported to Europe from Windsor, Canada, where they are produced. Beginning in October 2011, they were exported and sold as the Lancia Voyager in most European markets, as Chrysler operations were merged with those of Lancia in many European countries. In the United Kingdom, only the Grand Voyager is marketed.

Since 2011, the Voyager is sold under the Lancia badge in Europe to strengthen the Chrysler-Lancia integration, though it remains branded as the Chrysler Voyager in the United Kingdom and Ireland. In March 2015, Fiat Group announced that in 2017, Chrysler would be discontinued in the United Kingdom. It was removed from Chrysler UK's website in January 2016.

Notes

References

 
 2001–2003 Chrysler Voyager Prices & Reviews
 2009 Grand Voyager Road Test

External links

Chrysler.com – 2001 Chrysler Voyager homepage, through Internet Archive
Chrysler Minivan Club website
Allpar minivan section: creation, each generation, tech, rumors
2006 Chrysler Voyager site from Chrysler UK
Voyager 2002 2005 2007 2008 Technical Guide Manual

Voyager
Minivans
Euro NCAP large MPVs
Flexible-fuel vehicles
Front-wheel-drive vehicles
All-wheel-drive vehicles
2000s cars
2010s cars